Daleside is an independent brewery founded in 1988 in Harrogate, North Yorkshire, England.

History
Daleside Brewery was established in the mid 1980s in Harrogate. It moved to Starbeck in 1992 and went through periods of enlargement up until 1999. The company was founded by Bill Witty and in 1991, his son, Craig Witty became head brewer. Craig took over running the company when his father died in 2007 and continues to be the driving force of this very popular micro brewery.

It has won numerous awards for its ales, including its Morocco Ale. The 17th-century recipe for this ale, which  had been brewed especially for Charles II of England and named after his wife, Catherine of Braganza, who was described as being Moorish, was rediscovered in the early 1990s after being lost and was given to Daleside under special licence. Morocco Ale is specially brewed for Levens Hall in Cumbria, who are the owners of the secret recipe.

Products
Daleside produce a wide range of beers including;
Morocco Ale, a traditional spiced beer based on an Elizabethan recipe
Old Legover, a low abv Old Ale 
Monkey Wrench, a stronger Old Ale (CAMRA award-winning) which was brewed especially for a beer festival in Hartlepool (so named after the colloquial nickname for people from Hartlepool who are known as Monkey hangers)
Ripon Jewel, a strong pale ale, commissioned by Ripon Cathedral in honour of a gemstone associated with the founding of the cathedral. Brewed since 1999; a percentage of the profits go to the cathedrals maintenance fund.
Chocolate Stout, a stout where the barley is heavily roasted and Nestlé chocolate is added
Duff, a 5% abv dark ale ('Duff' sounds like 'dubh' Gaelic for "Dark")
Crack Shot Ale, named in honour of Jane Ingilby who supposedly dressed as a man and fought at the Battle of Marston Moor, later standing guard over Oliver Cromwell when he hid in Ripley Castle overnight after the battle
EU in, a golden fruity ale
EU out, a light hoppy ale (both of these were brewed in spring 2016 during the EU Referendum campaign in the United Kingdom)
Greengrass, named after the curmudgeonly character Claude Jeremiah Greengrass from the TV show Heartbeat

Sponsorship
Daleside Brewery sponsor the annual Auld Lang Syne  fell race in Haworth every New Year's Eve.

References

External links
Daleside Brewery
RateBeer

Breweries in Yorkshire
Companies based in Harrogate
British companies established in 1988
Food and drink companies established in 1988
1988 establishments in England
Charles II of England
Catherine of Braganza